Artur Igorevich Muginov (born 17 August 1994) is a Russian football player.

Club career
He made his professional debut in the Russian Professional Football League for FC Chertanovo Moscow on 14 July 2014 in a game against FC Metallurg Lipetsk.

He made his Russian Football National League debut for FC Shinnik Yaroslavl on 11 July 2016 in a game against FC Baltika Kaliningrad.

References

External links
 
 
 Career summary by sportbox.ru

1994 births
People from Elista
Living people
Russian footballers
Association football midfielders
FC Chertanovo Moscow players
FC Volgar Astrakhan players
FC Shinnik Yaroslavl players
FC Chayka Peschanokopskoye players
Sportspeople from Kalmykia